The Apocalypse Peaks are a group of peaks with a highest point of , standing east of Willett Range and between Barwick Valley and Balham Valley, in Victoria Land, Antarctica. The peaks were so named by the Victoria University of Wellington Antarctic Expedition (1958–59) because the peaks are cut by talus slopes which gives them the appearance of the "Riders of the Apocalypse." The peaks lie on the Pennell Coast, a portion of Antarctica lying between Cape Williams and Cape Adare.

See also 

 Turnbull Peak

References
 

Mountains of Victoria Land
Pennell Coast